Henry's new men are considered by historians to be those men that rose to prominence during the reign of Henry I of England (reigned 1100–1135) and whose families had not previously been prominent in royal service.

Overview
Although the use of the actual phrase "new men" dates from the writings of William Stubbs around 1874, the group of men was first singled out in the writings of writers contemporary with the men. The chronicler Orderic Vitalis in his Historia Ecclesiastica said that Henry had "enobled others of base stock who had served him well, raised them, so to say, from the dust, and heaping all kinds of favours on them, stationed them above earls and famous constables." Orderic went on to mention a number of men that he considered "new men".

Orderic's list of new men included:

 Geoffrey de Clinton
 Ralph Basset
 Hugh of Buckland
 Guillegrip
 Rainer of Bath
 William Trussebut
 Haimo of Falaise
 Wigan Algason
 Robert of Bostare

The medieval writer Henry of Huntingdon, writing in his De Contemptu Mundi, mentioned a number of the above and added:

 Richard Basset
 Geoffrey Ridel

The author of the Gesta Stephani, a chronicle of the reign of King Stephen of England, Henry's successor, named the following as new men during Henry's reign:

 Pain fitzJohn
 Miles of Gloucester

To these men, the modern historian H. F. Doherty, writing for the Oxford Dictionary of National Biography, adds:

 Eustace fitzJohn
 Walter de Beauchamp
 John Marshall
 Brien fitzCount

The historian and biographer of Henry I, Judith Green adds the following:

 William de Pont-del-l'Arche
 Osbert the priest
 Richard of Winchester
 Nigel d'Aubigny
 Roger of Salisbury

Citations

References

Further reading

 
 
 
 

Anglo-Normans
Henry I of England